Local elections took place in Cotabato City on May 9, 2022 within the Philippine general election. Registered voters of the city elected candidates for the following elective local posts: mayor, vice mayor. The city is also within Maguindanao's 1st district.

Background
The mayoral elections was contested between incumbent Mayor Cynthia Guiani-Sayadi of the Nationalist People's Coalition (NPC) and former journalist and city councilor Bruce Matabalao of the United Bangsamoro Justice Party (UBJP), a political party affiliated with the Moro Islamic Liberation Front (MILF). Members of the MILF forms a significant part of the current government of the Bangsamoro autonomous region which was formed in 2019 through a plebiscite. Cotabato City, formerly part of Soccsksargen opted to be included in Bangsamoro. 

The two parties are at odds at each other. Guiani-Sayadi campaigned against the inclusion of Cotabato City in Bangsamoro in the 2019 plebiscite but most residents voted in favor of the city joining the newly formed region. Guiani-Sayadi has challenged the result.

On May 7, 2022, the delivery of vote counting machines (VCMs) to the Cotabato City Central Pilot Elementary School supposedly for final testing was blocked by supporters from both camps. Tensions ended when the Commission on Elections (COMELEC) and the two parties agreed to allow soldiers and police officers to transport the VCMs. The two parties also agreed to an arrangement to have 500 police officers serve as Electoral Board (EB) members on election day.

Among the incidents reported during election day include: a malfunctioning VCM at a precinct in San Vicente Academy, harassment of voters in Sero Elementary School, armed men opening fire in Pagalamatan Elementary School in Tamontoka III injuring two people, and a man in Vilo Central Elementary School being mauled by a group of people trying to open the school gate.

The UBJP dominated the Cotabato City local elections. Matabalao and his running mate Butch Abu were proclaimed by the COMELEC Board of Canvassers as winners on May 10, 2022. The board also proclaimed the winning city councilors the following day namely: Florante Formento, Hunyn Abu, Maroup Pasawiran , Jay Jay Guiani, Abdulrakim Usman, Guiadzuri Midtimbang, Kusin Taha, Henjie Ali, Danda Juanday, and Abdilla Lim. All were from UBJP except for Guiani, Juanday and Lim who were part of incumbent mayor Guiani-Sayadi's slate.

Mayoral election 
Incumbent mayor Cynthia Guiani-Sayadi is running for another term.

Vice mayoral election 
Incumbent vice mayor Graham Nazer Dumama is running for another term.

References

2022 Philippine local elections
Cotabato City
May 2022 events in the Philippines